Gary Patrick Waddock (born 17 March 1962) is a former professional footballer. He is assistant head coach of Cambridge United.

A former midfielder, he spent most of his career playing for Queens Park Rangers and Luton Town. He also had stints at Belgian club Charleroi and at Millwall, Swindon Town and Bristol Rovers. Born in England, he represented the Republic of Ireland internationally at youth and senior levels, making 21 appearances and scoring 3 goals for the Republic of Ireland senior national team.

Having retired from playing in 1998, Waddock went into management, taking over former club Queens Park Rangers in 2006. He went on to manage Aldershot Town, Wycombe Wanderers and Oxford United. He has worked at MK Dons as head of coaching and Portsmouth as assistant and caretaker manager.

Playing career
Waddock grew up in Alperton, a suburb of Wembley, and attended Alperton High School. During his playing career, he appeared professionally (predominantly as a midfielder) for six different clubs. He earned 21 international caps for the Republic of Ireland, scoring three goals in the process. Waddock was named by Jack Charlton in the squad for the 1990 FIFA World Cup, but having travelled to the pre-tournament camp in Malta, he was dropped at the last minute in favour of Alan McLoughlin, seen as better cover for players nursing injuries. Years later Charlton later said that he should have kept Waddock and dropped veteran striker Frank Stapleton instead.

He debuted for Queens Park Rangers in 1979 and went on to play 203 times and scored eight goals in the following eight years, playing in the 1982 FA Cup Final.

He left QPR for Charleroi in Belgium for three years between 1987 and 1989, making 40 appearances and scoring one goal, before returning to London with Millwall. In two years with Millwall, Waddock appeared 58 times and scored twice for the 'Lions'.

By 1991 he was back at QPR although he failed to make the first team and found himself on loan at Swindon Town where he made six appearances. Following on from his spell at Swindon, Waddock moved to Bristol Rovers in 1992, scoring one goal in 71 matches over the next three years.

His swan song took place with Luton Town. In four years he made 153 appearances and scored his final three professional goals.

Managerial career

Queens Park Rangers
During his time as manager, Ian Holloway took Waddock onto the coaching staff at Loftus Road at the QPR academy. Waddock found himself the new caretaker manager at QPR following Holloway's suspension on 6 February 2006. Waddock, along with Alan McDonald as his assistant, managed to keep the club in the Championship, finishing 21st.

He was appointed full-time manager on 28 June 2006 after Holloway was put on gardening leave and eventually left for Plymouth Argyle. On 20 September 2006, after a poor set of results had left QPR bottom of the table, Waddock was replaced by John Gregory. He did, however, stay at the club as assistant manager.

Aldershot Town
He was confirmed as the new manager of Conference side Aldershot Town on 19 May 2007. Waddock won his first trophy on 3 April 2008, when Aldershot Town beat Rushden & Diamonds 4–3 on penalties in the Conference League Cup. The Shots finished top of the Conference National with a record 101 points, and were promoted to the Football League after a 1–1 draw away at Exeter City gave them the point they needed. The Shots ended the season on an 18-match undefeated run. In recognition of this achievement, Waddock was named Conference manager of the year.

Wycombe Wanderers
Waddock was appointed manager of the League One side on 13 October 2009 as successor to the sacked Peter Taylor.
Despite a turn in form, and a large turnover of players towards the end of the season, Waddock was unable to prevent Wycombe Wanderers' relegation to League Two.

Waddock again added to his squad in the summer by signing Nikki Bull, Andy Sandell and Dave Winfield, who he had previously managed, whilst at Aldershot Town. At the start of 2011, he captured Scott Donnelly on a season long loan, who he previously managed at both Queens Park Rangers and Aldershot Town.

Wycombe finished the 2010–11 season by being promoted back to League One (finishing third in League Two) after beating Southend United 3–1 at Adams Park in their final game of the season. However, they were relegated back to League Two the following season. On 22 September, Waddock was sacked as manager after a 1–0 defeat to AFC Wimbledon, their third successive defeat, left them 21st in League Two.

Milton Keynes Dons

In June 2013, Waddock was appointed as Head of Coaching at Milton Keynes Dons alongside Karl Robinson.

Oxford United

On 22 March 2014, Waddock was appointed as Head Coach of Oxford United, replacing caretaker manager Mickey Lewis. The club failed to reach the League Two play-offs under his managership, losing 7 of the 8 games played during his tenure, and his contract was terminated in July the same year after changes in the club's ownership.

Barnet
Waddock joined Barnet in a coaching role for the 2014–15 season on a casual basis. In November, he agreed a rolling month-to-month contract, but left for Portsmouth on 12 December.

Portsmouth 
On 12 December 2014, Waddock was announced as the new assistant manager of Portsmouth. On 13 April 2015, Waddock was named as temporary manager for the last four games of the 2014–15 season after Andy Awford left the position by mutual consent.

Return to Aldershot Town 
On 5 May 2016, Waddock was reappointed as first-team manager at his former club Aldershot Town of the National League.
On 2 May 2019, Waddock left the club after his contract was mutually terminated following their relegation from the National League.

Southend United 
On 5 July 2019, he joined Southend United as assistant manager to Kevin Bond. After Bond's resignation he took caretaker charge of the team until the appointment of Sol Campbell.

Cambridge United
On 10 July 2020, Waddock was appointed Assistant Head Coach of Cambridge United.

Managerial statistics

Honours

As a manager

Promotions
2007–08: Conference National Champion (promotion to League Two) – Aldershot Town
2010–11: League Two Third Place (promotion to League One) – Wycombe Wanderers

Cups
2007–08: Conference League Cup Winner – Aldershot Town

See also
 List of Republic of Ireland international footballers born outside the Republic of Ireland

References

External links
 
 
 

1962 births
Living people
People from Alperton
Footballers from Kingsbury, London
English footballers
English expatriate footballers
Republic of Ireland association footballers
Republic of Ireland under-21 international footballers
Republic of Ireland under-23 international footballers
Republic of Ireland B international footballers
Republic of Ireland international footballers
Association football midfielders
Queens Park Rangers F.C. players
R. Charleroi S.C. players
Millwall F.C. players
Swindon Town F.C. players
Bristol Rovers F.C. players
Luton Town F.C. players
English Football League players
Belgian Pro League players
Expatriate footballers in Belgium
English football managers
Republic of Ireland football managers
Queens Park Rangers F.C. managers
Aldershot Town F.C. managers
Wycombe Wanderers F.C. managers
Portsmouth F.C. managers
English Football League managers
National League (English football) managers
Barnet F.C. non-playing staff
English expatriate sportspeople in Belgium
Oxford United F.C. managers
Southend United F.C. non-playing staff
Southend United F.C. managers
Cambridge United F.C. non-playing staff
FA Cup Final players